Toccoa Falls is a waterfall with a vertical drop of  on the campus of Toccoa Falls College in Stephens County, Georgia.  Toccoa comes from the Cherokee word "Tagwâ′hĭ", meaning "Catawba place"  or "beautiful".

Legend

The land around Toccoa Falls was traded to White settlers in 1783, and written accounts of the falls began to appear in publications in the nineteenth century. White folk tales about Toccoa Falls are recounted in the writings of Elizabeth F. Ellet and Charles Montgomery Skinner. Both Ellet and Skinner's stories portray tension between the White settlers and the Native Americans of the area, describing the White settlers as victims of the Native Americans' violence. The stories, which Ellet and Skinner both independently suggest are apocryphal, involve a theme of White women tricking groups of men to walk off of Toccoa Falls, although the men are Native American in Skinner's story whereas in Ellet's, the White woman has been forced by Native Americans to trick her fellow White settlers.

In the 1890s, ethnographer James Mooney compiled myths of the Cherokee while living with them for several years. Mooney recounts a story about Toccoa Falls told to him by his half-Cherokee assistant in which, when the White newcomers saw Toccoa Falls for the first time, they saw a Cherokee woman walking underneath the water who then suddenly appeared on top of the falls after a moment. Mooney's assistant says that the woman in the story "must have been one of the Nûñnë'hï," a race of spirit people in Cherokee mythology.

Dam break

During the early morning hours of November 6, 1977, after five days of almost continual rain, the dam that impounded the waters of Kelly Barnes Lake (located above the Toccoa Falls College campus) burst, and 176 million gallons of water surged through the campus below in the space of a few minutes. Most of the college personnel who lived in the path of the flood were asleep at the time, and 39 of them were swept to their deaths in the raging waters of Toccoa Creek.  The dam was not rebuilt.

References

External links
 View of Toccoa Falls from 1929. From Vanishing Georgia, Georgia Archives, University System of Georgia. Web. May 19, 2016.
 View of Toccoa Falls from 1885. From Atlanta History Photograph Collection, Kenan Research Center, Atlanta History Center. Web. June 4, 2016.
 Toccoa Fall[s], Height 186 feet, Toccoa, Ga.. Historic Postcard Collection, RG 48-2-5, Georgia Archives, Digital Library of Georgia. Web. June 4, 2016.
 
 View of Toccoa Falls from 1875. From Stephen A. Schwarzman Building / Photography Collection, Miriam and Ira D. Wallach Division of Art, Prints and Photographs, New York Public Library. Original source: Robert N. Dennis collection of stereoscopic views.
 View of Toccoa Falls from the David Lewis Earnest photographic collection, Hargrett Rare Book and Manuscript Library, The University of Georgia Libraries.

Landforms of Stephens County, Georgia
Waterfalls of Georgia (U.S. state)
Tourist attractions in Stephens County, Georgia